Fritillaria grandiflora is a species of fritillary native to Azerbaijan and Georgia. It grows in temperate mixed forests. The species is listed in the Red Data Book of Azerbaijan, having been previously listed in the Red Data Book of the Soviet Union.

References

External links
Native range map 

grandiflora
Flora of Azerbaijan
Flora of Georgia (country)
Plants described in 1919